Néstor Almendros Cuyás,  (30 October 1930 – 4 March 1992) was a Spanish cinematographer. One of the most highly appraised contemporary cinematographers, "Almendros was an artist of deep integrity, who believed the most beautiful light was natural light...he will always be remembered as a cinematographer of absolute truth...a true master of light".

Early life
Néstor Almendros Cuyás was born in Barcelona, Spain, but at 18 moved to Cuba to join his exiled anti-Francisco Franco father. In Havana, he wrote film reviews. Then he went on to study in Rome at the Centro Sperimentale di Cinematografia. He directed six shorts in Cuba and two in New York City.

After the 1959 Cuban Revolution, he returned and made several documentaries for the Castro regime. But after two of his shorts (Gente en la playa and La tumba francesa) were banned, he moved to Paris. Starting in 1964, he became the favorite collaborator of French New Wave director Éric Rohmer. In the early seventies he also started working with François Truffaut, Barbet Schroeder and other directors.

Career
Almendros began his Hollywood career with Days of Heaven (1978), written and directed by Terrence Malick, who admired Almendros' work on The Wild Child (1970). Almendros was impressed by Malick's knowledge of photography and his willingness to use little studio lighting. The film's cinematography was modeled after silent films, which often used natural light. In 1979, Almendros won the Academy Award for Best Cinematography for Days of Heaven.

Almendros received three further Academy Award nominations for his work on Kramer vs. Kramer (1979), The Blue Lagoon (1980) and Sophie's Choice (1982), making him the most nominated Spanish person in Academy history as of the 93rd Academy Awards in 2021.

Almendros was the cinematographer for the John Lennon documentary, Imagine: John Lennon (1988), directed by Andrew Solt.

In his later years, Almendros co-directed two documentaries about the human rights situation in Cuba: Mauvaise Conduite (1984) (Improper Conduct) about the persecution of gay people in Cuba; and Nadie escuchaba (Nobody Was Listening), about the alleged arrest, imprisonment and torture of former comrades of Fidel Castro. He also shot several prestigious advertisements for Giorgio Armani (directed by Martin Scorsese), Calvin Klein (directed by Richard Avedon) and Freixenet.

Legacy and honors
Human Rights Watch International has named an award after him by establishing the Nestor Almendros Award for Courage in Filmmaking and it is given every year at the Human Rights Watch International Film Festival.

In 1980, Almendros won the César Award for François Truffaut's The Last Metro.

Death
In 1992, Néstor Almendros died of AIDS-related lymphoma in New York City at the age of 61.

See also
 List of Spanish Academy Award winners and nominees

References

External links
 

1930 births
1992 deaths
Deaths from lymphoma
AIDS-related deaths in New York (state)
Spanish expatriates in France
Spanish expatriates in the United States
Spanish cinematographers
Spanish gay men
Best Cinematographer Academy Award winners
Centro Sperimentale di Cinematografia alumni
César Award winners
LGBT film directors
LGBT history in Spain
20th-century Spanish LGBT people